Françoise Paulette Louise Dorléac (21 March 194226 June 1967) was a French actress. She was the elder sister of Catherine Deneuve, with whom she starred in the 1967 musical, The Young Girls of Rochefort. Her other films include Philippe de Broca's movie That Man from Rio, François Truffaut's The Soft Skin, Roman Polanski's Cul-de-sac, and Val Guest's Where the Spies Are.

Biography

Early films
Dorléac was the daughter of screen actors Maurice Dorléac and Renée Simonot. Slim, fair and blonde, she made her film debut in The Wolves in the Sheepfold (1960), directed by Hervé Bromberger. She went on to appear in The Door Slams (1960) with Dany Saval and her sister Catherine Deneuve. Dorléac had a small role in Tonight or Never (1961) with Anna Karina for director Michel Deville, The Girl with the Golden Eyes (1961) with Marie Laforêt, All the Gold in the World (1961) with Bourvil, and Adorable Liar (1961) from director Deville.

Dorléac was Jean-Pierre Cassel's leading lady in The Dance (1962) and had one of the leads in a TV movie, Les trois chapeaux claques (1962), directed by Jean-Pierre Marchand.

French stardom
Dorléac leapt to international stardom with the female lead in That Man from Rio (1964) starring Jean-Paul Belmondo and directed by Philippe de Broca. She followed it with The Soft Skin (1964) directed by François Truffaut.

She was in The Gentle Art of Seduction (1964) with Belmondo and Jean-Paul Brialy, with her sister in a support part. Dorléac was one of several French stars in Circle of Love (1964) directed by Roger Vadim, and appeared in a TV show, Les petites demoiselles (1964), directed by Deville and starring De Broca. She also appeared in the comedy films, Arsène Lupin contre Arsène Lupin (1962) opposite Jean-Claude Brialy, and Male Hunt (1964), with Belmondo and her sister.

International career

That Man from Rio and Soft Skin were seen widely internationally and Dorléac received an offer to play the female lead in an expensive Hollywood financed epic, Genghis Khan (1965). She was David Niven's love interest in a spy film at MGM, Where the Spies Are (1966).

Dorléac appeared as the adulterous wife in Roman Polanski's black comedy Cul-de-sac (1966), shot in Britain. She returned to France to star in a TV adaption of the Prosper Mérimée novel Julie de Chaverny ou la Double Méprise (1966) directed by Marchand. Then she joined Gene Kelly and her sister Catherine, who was a cinematic star by this time, in The Young Girls of Rochefort (1967), an homage to Hollywood musicals.

Her final film role was the female lead in Billion Dollar Brain (1967) opposite Michael Caine, who played spy Harry Palmer.

Death
Dorléac was on the brink of international stardom when she died in a traffic accident on 26 June 1967, aged 25. She lost control of her rented Renault 10 and hit a signpost ten kilometres from Nice at the Villeneuve-Loubet exit of the autoroute La Provençale. The car flipped over and burst into flames. Dorléac had been en route to Nice Airport and was afraid of missing her flight. She was seen struggling to get out of the car, but was unable to open the door. Police later identified her body only from the fragment of a cheque book, a diary, and her driver's licence.

Filmography

Feature films

 Les loups dans la bergerie (1960) – Madeleine
 Les portes claquent (1960) – Dominique (together with her sister Catherine Deneuve)
 Ce soir ou jamais (1961) – Danièle
 La fille aux yeux d'or (1961) – Katia
 All the Gold in the World (1961) – La journaliste
 Adorable menteuse (1962)
 The Dance (1962) – Françoise
 Arsène Lupin contre Arsène Lupin (1962) – Nathalie Cartier
 L'homme de Rio (1964) – Agnès Villermosa
 La peau douce (1964) – Nicole 
 Circle of Love (1964)
 Male Hunt (1964) – Françoise Bicart alias Sandra Rossen
 Genghis Khan (1965) – Bortei
 Where the Spies Are (1966) – Vikki
 Cul-de-sac (1966) – Teresa
 Les demoiselles de Rochefort (1967) – Solange Garnier (also with Deneuve)
 Billion Dollar Brain (1967) – Anya (final film role, released posthumously)

Television roles 
 Les trois chapeaux claques (TV movie, 1962) – Paula
 Les petites demoiselles (TV movie, 1964) – Anne
 Julie de Chaverny ou la Double Méprise (TV movie, 1967) – Julie

Appearances as herself
 Cinépanorama (TV series documentary, 1959) – herself
 Les échos du cinéma (TV series short, 1961–1962) – herself
 Discorama (TV series, 1962) – herself 
 Teuf-teuf (TV musical divertissement, 1963) – herself
 4 FOIS D – Françoise Dorléac (Documentary short, 1964) – herself
 Grand écran (TV series documentary, 1964) – herself
 Ni figue ni raisin (TV series, 1965) – herself
 New Reports from France (TV series documentary, 1966) – herself, segment four
 Dim Dam Dom (TV series documentary, 1966) – herself
 Gala de l'Unicef (TV series, 1966) – herself
 Septième art septième case (TV series, 1966) – herself
 Derrière l'écran (TV series, 1966) – herself
 Tilt (TV series, 1967) – herself
 Hollywood in Deblatschka Pescara (Short film, 1967) – herself, uncredited
 The Monkees (TV series, 1968)  – herself, uncredited (one episode, filmed days before her death, aired posthumously)

References

External links

 
 

1942 births
1967 deaths
20th-century French actresses
Actresses from Paris
French National Academy of Dramatic Arts alumni
Deaths from fire
Dorléac family
French film actresses
French people of Norman descent
Road incident deaths in France